Super Jam is a live studio recording featuring jazz, pop and traditional standards, many of them film scores, included in the German TV series, Villa Fantastica. The album featured the series' musical director Brian Auger on piano, Pete York on drums, Dick Morrissey on tenor saxophone, Roy Williams on trombone, Harvey Weston on bass guitar, plus the singers Zoot Money and Maria Muldaur.

Track listing 
"Ding-Dong! The Witch Is Dead" - H. Arlen & Y. Harburg/B. Auger (2.40)
"Danny Boy" - Trad./B. Auger (4.01)
"What A Wonderful World" - G. D. Weiss & R. Thiele/B. Auger (3.35)
"Fly Me To The Moon" - B. Howard/B. Auger (3.17)
"Tara's Theme" - M. Steiner & Mc. David (4.36)
"Take These Chains from My Heart" - W. H. Heath & F. Rose (1.59)
"As Time Goes By" - H. Hupfeld (2.57)
"Lullaby of Broadway" - H. Warren & A. Dubin (2.53)
"Rockin' Chair" - H. Carmichael (4.41)
"You Are So Beautiful" - B. Preston (3.09)
"Lover Man" - J. Davis & R. Ramirez (5.31)
"Peter Gunn" - H. Mancini (2.05)
"Come Sunday" - D. Ellington (2.57)
"Hooray For Hollywood" - R. Whiting & J. Mercer (3.06)
"When You Wish Upon A Star" - N. Washington & L. Harline (2.59)
"Over The Rainbow" - H. Arlen & Y. Harburg (2.36)

References

Dick Morrissey albums
Maria Muldaur albums
Zoot Money albums
Brian Auger albums
Pete York albums
1990 live albums
Live jazz albums
Collaborative albums